Journey of Jesus: The Calling is a browser game developed by Lightside Games. It was released as a Facebook browser game.

Gameplay
In Journey of Jesus, the player takes the role of Jesus Christ, performing miracles such as healing the sick and walking on water.

Development
Journey of Jesus: The Calling was developed by Lightside Games. Self-described as the first-ever video game about Jesus Christ, Lightside's CEO Brent Dusing wanted players to “walk in the Messiah’s steps, in an authentic experience of Israel in Christ’s time.”

The game was released on May 15, 2012. The same day, Blizzard Entertainment's Diablo 3 was also released. Lightside acknowledged the timing by having an image of Jesus fighting Diablo in a boxing ring on "Journey of Jesus's" Facebook page.

Reception
The game was praised by Christian leaders. Darrell L. Bock, research professor at the Dallas Theological Seminary, said the game would take players closer to Jesus in a "fun, reflective and entertaining way".

Kotaku's Luke Plunkett called the gameplay of the game "horrific" due to its emphasis on microtransactions, which in his view was antithetical to the idea of the game. He commented that it squandered the potential of the Bible, and especially the Old Testament, as an "amazing story".

References

External links
 Journey of Jesus

2012 video games
Christian video games
Facebook games
Video games developed in the United States
Single-player video games